Jeanne Aline Herveux, generally known as Jane Herveu, (1885–1955) was a pioneering French aviator who obtained her pilot's licence on 7 December 1910.

Life 
Born on 10 December 1885 in Paris, she was first known as an automobile exhibition driver, performing at the Crystal Palace in London and taking part in car and motorcycle races at various locations in France.

After training at the Blériot flying school, she received French Licence No. 318 on 7 December 1910, becoming the fourth woman in France to be licensed after Elise Deroche, Marthe Niel and Marie Marvingt. From 28 May to 8 June 1911 she appeared at the flying exhibition in Lyon. After several other appearances, she competed in the Femina Cup in 1911 but did not win. She opened a flying school for women but it was not successful.

In 1913, she married Paul Boulzaguet. After the end of the First World War, she moved to the United States where she worked in fashion. She died on 14 January 1955.

References

1885 births
1955 deaths
Aviation pioneers
Aviators from Paris
French women aviators